The Convention concerning Wages, Hours of Work on Board Ship and Manning (or Wages, Hours of Work and Manning (Sea) Convention) is a convention of the International Labour Organization originally drafted in 1946 and revised conventions in 1949 and 1958, none of which entered into force.

Entry into Force
The criterion of entry into force for all three conventions required a minimum number countries acceding with a significant sea trade volume as well as requirements of the aggregate of trade volume by ratifying countries:
ratification by nine countries from the group: Argentina, Australia, Belgium, Brazil, Canada, Chile, China, Denmark, Finland, France, Germany (1958 convention only), Greece, India, Ireland, Italy, Japan (1958 convention only), Netherlands, Norway, Poland, Portugal, Spain (1958 convention only), Sweden, Soviet Union (1958 convention only), Turkey, United Kingdom, United States  and Yugoslavia;
ratification from at least five countries with over one million gross register tons of shipping;
an aggregate tonnage by ratifying countries of more than fifteen million gross register tons.

Ratifications
An overview of number of ratifications of the conferences is shown below. Although the number of ratifications was larger for the revised conventions, the entry into force criteria were met in none of them. The conventions were closed for signature upon the entry into force of the Seafarers' Hours of Work and the Manning of Ships Convention, 1996. 

An overview of the ratifications of the conventions as of 27 May 2013 is shown below. Only the 1958 received ratifications from the list of countries of which 9 were required to ratify. Six such ratifications were received (Yugoslavia also ratified, but is depicted in the list as its successor states). Denouncements of the convention were a result of the entry into force of the Seafarers' Hours of Work and the Manning of Ships Convention, 1996 for those countries.  Also ratification of the Maritime Labour Convention results -after it enters into force on 20 August 2013- in denouncement of the conventions.

See also
Convention concerning Hours of Work on Board Ship and Manning, a 1936 convention revised by these conventions
Convention concerning Seafarers' Hours of Work and the Manning of Ships, a 1996 convention which revised these conventions
Maritime Labour Convention, a 2005 convention revising these conventions (which not entered into effect)

External links
Full text of the 1946, 1949, 1958 conventions at the ILO website
Ratification status of the 1946, 1949, 1958 conventions at the ILO website

International Labour Organization conventions
Working time
Treaties concluded in 1946
Treaties concluded in 1949
Treaties concluded in 1958
Treaties not entered into force
Admiralty law treaties
1946 in labor relations